Time of Parting (Vreme razdelno) is a novel written by Anton Donchev and published in 1964.

Reviews
Time of Parting was judged the 2nd greatest work ever in the Bulgarian Big Read in 2008–09.

References

1964 Bulgarian novels